Robert "Rob" Quartly is a Canadian music video, television and commercial director.  During the 1980s, Quartly produced numerous Juno Award-winning music videos for artists, including Corey Hart, Gowan, Platinum Blonde and Rush. As both a director and a producer, he gave birth to Canada's music video production industry. Quartly has been recognized with JUNOs, CFTA personal achievement awards and his induction as the first member of the Much Music Hall of Fame.

His activity in the advertising industry has been equally successful with recognition at Cannes, Toronto and New York Art Directors Club, Bessies, Clios, One Show, Marketing Awards.

Television projects have seen him direct The Vacant Lot series, act as Co-Creator of the hit CBC show "The Triple Sensation", and create/direct/executive produce the CHUM comedy series "And Go,!"

Rob Quartly is represented by Sugino Studio based in Toronto, Ontario.

Selected videography

Music videos
1980 – "Jealous Girl" – The Extras
1982 – "Nova Heart" – Spoons
1983 – "Don't Walk Past" – Blue Peter
1983 – "Melody" – Boys Brigade
1983 – "Passion of Love" – Boys Brigade
1983 – "First Time for Everything" – Coney Hatch
1983 – "Shake It" – Coney Hatch
1983 – "Sunglasses at Night" – Corey Hart
1983 – "It Ain't Enough (version 1)" – Corey Hart
1983 – "Found You Out" – Drivers
1983 – "Stolen Treasure" – Drivers
1983 – "Talk All Night" – Drivers
1983 – "Tears on My Anorak" – Drivers
1983 – "Information" – Eric Martin
1983 – "A Little Good News" – Ann Murray
1983 – "Old Emotions" – Spoons
1984 – "I Wanna Go Back" – Billy Satellite
1984 – "Hold on to 18" – Black 'n Blue
1984 – "It Ain't Enough (version 2 for U.S.)" – Corey Hart
1984 – "Call of the Wild" – Gary O'
1984 – "Rock You" – Helix
1984 – "I Want You Back" – Sherry Kean
1984 – "Doesn't Really Matter" – Platinum Blonde
1984 – "Standing in the Dark" – Platinum Blonde
1985 – "Talk Talk" – Arrows
1985 – "Never Surrender" – Corey Hart
1985 – "Cryin' Over You" – Platinum Blonde
1985 – "Everything in My Heart" – Corey Hart
1985 – "A Criminal Mind" – Gowan
1985 – "Strange Animal" – Gowan
1985 – "The Big Money" – Rush
1986 – "Situation Critical" – Platinum Blonde
1986 – "Chains" – Arrows
1986 – "Heart of the City" – Arrows
1986 – "Cosmetics" by Gowan
1986 – "Don't Forget Me (When I'm Gone)" by Glass Tiger
1986 – "Eurasian Eyes" – Corey Hart
1986 – "Angry Young Man" – Corey Hart
1986 – "Can't Help Falling in Love" – Corey Hart
1986 – "Harmony" by Ian Thomas
1987 – "This Mourning" – Chalk Circle
1987 – "Dancin' with My Mirror" – Corey Hart
1987 – "Awake the Giant" – Gowan
1987 – "Moonlight Desires" – Gowan
1987 – "Easy to Tame" – Kim Mitchell
1988 – "Come Back to Me" – Barney Bentall
1989 – "I Can't Take It" – Billy Newton-Davis
1990 – "Where Does My Heart Beat Now" – Celine Dion
1992 – "92 Days of Rain" – Corey Hart

Other works
1993 – "The Vacant Lot" – TV Series
2004 – And Go! – TV series
2005 – "Milk Skaters" – commercial for Dairy Farmers of Canada, Ontario
2008 – Schneiders – commercial

Awards
 1984 – Winner – Juno Award for Video of the Year – for "Sunglasses at Night" by Corey Hart
 1984 – Nominated – Juno Award for Video of the Year – for "I Want You Back" by Sherry Kean
 1984 – Nominated – Juno Award for Video of the Year – for "Doesn't Really Matter" by Platinum Blonde
 1984 – Nominated – Juno Award for Video of the Year – for "Standing in the Dark" by Platinum Blonde
 1985 – Winner – Juno Award for Video of the Year – for "Criminal Mind" by Gowan
 1985 – Nominated – Juno Award for Video of the Year – for "Strange Animal" by Gowan
 1985 – Nominated – Juno Award for Video of the Year – for "Never Surrender" by Corey Hart
 1986 – Nominated – Juno Award for Video of the Year – for "Cosmetics" by Gowan
 1986 – Nominated – Juno Award for Video of the Year – for "Don't Forget Me (When I'm Gone)" by Glass Tiger
 1986 – Nominated – Juno Award for Video of the Year – for "Harmony" by Ian Thomas
 1987 – Nominated – Juno Award for Video of the Year – for "Easy to Tame" by Kim Mitchel
 1990 – Winner – "Hall of Fame Award" – Canadian Music Video Awards (CMVAs) (now known as the MuchMusic Video Awards)
 Winner – Personal Achievement award – Canadian Film & Television Producers Association

References

External links
 Select Films – Current Website
 Sugino Studio – Represents Rob Quartly
 Interesting is Everywhere – Interesting is Everywhere Website

Canadian television directors
Canadian music video directors
Year of birth missing (living people)
Living people
Television commercial directors
Juno Award for Video of the Year winners